Nizhny Balykley is a rural locality (a selo) in Verkhnebalykleyskoye Rural Settlement, Bykovsky District, Volgograd Oblast, Russia. The population was 96 as of 2010.

Geography 
Nizhny Balykley is located on the bank of the Volga River, 41 km south of Bykovo (the district's administrative centre) by road. Verkhny Balykley is the nearest rural locality.

References 

Rural localities in Bykovsky District